2000 was designated as the International Year for the Culture of Peace and the World Mathematical Year.

The year 2000 is sometimes abbreviated as "Y2K" (the "Y" stands for "year", and the "K" stands for "kilo" which means "thousand"). The year 2000 was the subject of Y2K concerns, which were fears that computers would not shift from 1999 to 2000 correctly. However, by the end of 1999, many companies had already converted to new, or upgraded, existing software. Some even obtained "Y2K certification". As a result of massive effort, relatively few problems occurred.

Events

January
 January 6 – The last naturally-conceived Pyrenean ibex is found dead, apparently killed by a falling tree.
 January 10 – America Online announces an agreement to purchase Time Warner for $162 billion (the largest-ever corporate merger).
 January 14 
The Dow Jones Industrial Average closes at 11,722.98 (at the peak of the Dot-com bubble).
The United Nations' International Criminal Tribunal for the former Yugoslavia sentences five Bosnian Croats to up to 25 years in prison for the 1993 killing of more than 100 Bosnian Muslims.
 January 30 – Kenya Airways Flight 431 crashes off the Ivory Coast into the Atlantic Ocean, killing 169 people.
 January 31 – Alaska Airlines Flight 261 crashes off the California coast into the Pacific Ocean; all 88 passengers and crew are killed.

February
 February 5 – Second Chechen War: Novye Aldi massacre – Russian forces summarily execute 56-60 civilians in a suburb of Grozny.
 February 6 – Second Chechen War: Battle of Grozny (1999–2000) ends as Russian forces conclude capture of the Chechen capital Grozny. 
 February 9 – Torrential rains in Africa lead to the worst flooding in Mozambique in 50 years, which lasts until March and kills 800 people.
 February 21 – UNESCO holds the inaugural celebration of International Mother Language Day.
 February 29 – A rare century leap year date occurs. Usually, century years are common years due to not being exactly divisible by 400. 2000 is the first such year to have a February 29 since the year 1600, making it only the second such occasion since the Gregorian Calendar was introduced in the late 16th century. The next such leap year will occur in 2400.

March
 March 10 – The NASDAQ Composite Index reaches an all-time high of 5,048. Two weeks later, the NASDAQ-100, S&P 500, and Wilshire 5000 reach their peaks prior to the Dot-com bubble, ending a bull market run that had lasted over 17 years.
 March 12
 Pope John Paul II apologizes for the wrongdoings by members of the Roman Catholic Church throughout the ages.
 A Zenit-3SL sea launch fails due to a software bug.
 March 13 – The United States dollar becomes the official currency of Ecuador, replacing the Ecuadorian sucre.
March 17 – Uganda mass death: 778 members of the Movement for the Restoration of the Ten Commandments of God die in Uganda.

April
 April 30 – Canonization of Faustina Kowalska in the presence of 200,000 people and the first Divine Mercy Sunday celebrated worldwide.

May
 May 1 – A new class of composite material is fabricated, which has a combination of physical properties never before seen in a natural or man-made material.
 May 4 – The 7.6  Central Sulawesi earthquake affects Banggai, Indonesia, with a maximum Mercalli intensity of VII (Very strong), leaving 46 dead and 264 injured.
 May 5
 After originating in the Philippines, the ILOVEYOU computer virus spreads quickly throughout the world.
 A rare conjunction of seven celestial bodies (Sun, Moon, planets Mercury–Saturn) occurs during the new moon.
 May 11 – India's population reaches 1 billion.
 May 13
 A fireworks factory disaster in Enschede, Netherlands, kills 23.
 Millennium Force opens at Cedar Point amusement park in Sandusky, Ohio as the world's tallest and fastest roller coaster
 May 24 – Real Madrid C.F. defeats Valencia CF 3–0 in the UEFA Champions League Final at Stade de France to win their second title between 1998 and 2002, and their eighth overall.

June
 June 4 – The 7.9  Enggano earthquake shakes southwestern Sumatra, killing 103 people and injuring at least 2,174.
 June 5 – 405 The Movie, the first short film widely distributed on the Internet, is released.
 June 10 – July 2 – Belgium and the Netherlands jointly host the UEFA Euro 2000 football tournament, which is won by France.
 June 17 – A centennial earthquake (6.5 on the Richter scale) hits Iceland on its national day.
 June 26 – A preliminary draft of genomes, as part of the Human Genome Project, is finished. It is announced at the White House by President Clinton.

July
 July 1 – The Øresund Bridge between Denmark and Sweden is officially opened for traffic.
 July 2 – France defeats Italy 2–1 after extra time in the final of the European Championship, becoming the first team to win the World Cup and European Championship consecutively.
 July 7 – The draft assembly of Human Genome Project is announced at the White House by US President Bill Clinton, Francis Collins, and Craig Venter.
 July 10 – In southern Nigeria, a leaking petroleum pipeline explodes, killing about 250 villagers who were scavenging gasoline.
 July 14 – A powerful solar flare, later named the Bastille Day event, causes a geomagnetic storm on Earth.
 July 25 – Air France Flight 4590, a Concorde aircraft, crashes into a hotel in Gonesse just after takeoff from Paris, killing all 109 aboard and 4 in the hotel.

August
 August 3 – Rioting erupts on the Paulsgrove estate in Portsmouth, Hampshire, England, after more than 100 people besiege a block of flats allegedly housing a convicted paedophile. This is the latest vigilante violence against suspected sex offenders since the beginning of the "naming and shaming" anti-pedophile campaign by the tabloid newspaper News of the World.
 August 7 – DeviantART is launched.
 August 8 – The Confederate submarine H. L. Hunley is raised to the surface after 136 years on the ocean floor.
 August 12 – The Russian submarine Kursk sinks in the Barents Sea during one of the largest Russian naval exercises since the 1991 dissolution of the Soviet Union, resulting in the deaths of all 118 men on board.
 August 14 – Tsar Nicholas II and his family are canonized by the synod of the Russian Orthodox Church.

September 
 September 6 – The last wholly Swedish-owned arms manufacturer, Bofors, is sold to American arms manufacturer United Defense.
 September 6–8 – World leaders attend the Millennium Summit at U.N. Headquarters.
 September 7–14 – Fuel protests take place in the United Kingdom, with refineries blockaded, and supply to the country's network of petrol stations halted.
 September 10 – Operation Barras: A British military operation to free five soldiers from the Royal Irish Regiment that were held captive for over two weeks during the Sierra Leone Civil War, all of which were rescued.
 September 13 – Steve Jobs introduces the public beta of Mac OS X for US$29.95.
 September 15 – October 1 – The 2000 Summer Olympics, held in Sydney, Australia, is the first Olympic Games of the 2000s.
 September 16 – Ukrainian journalist Georgiy Gongadze is last seen alive; this day is taken as the commemoration date of his death.
 September 26 – The Greek ferry Express Samina sinks off the coast of the island of Paros; 80 out of a total of over 500 passengers perish in one of Greece's worst sea disasters.

October
 October 3 – Approximate start of Autumn 2000 Western Europe floods (particularly affecting the UK), precipitated by days of heavy rain.
 October 5 – Mass demonstrations in Belgrade lead to resignation of Yugoslavia's president Slobodan Milošević.
 October 11 –  of coal sludge spill in Martin County, Kentucky (considered a greater environmental disaster than the Exxon Valdez oil spill).
 October 12 – In Aden, Yemen, USS Cole is badly damaged by two Al-Qaeda suicide bombers, who place a small boat laden with explosives alongside the United States Navy destroyer, killing 17 crew members and wounding at least 39.
October 17 – A Great North Eastern Railway Intercity 225 Express Train is derailed, killing four people and injuring many others, in Hatfield, Hertfordshire, United Kingdom.
 October 22 
 The Mainichi Shimbun newspaper exposes Japanese archeologist Shinichi Fujimura as a fraud; Japanese archaeologists had based their treatises on his findings.
Japanese Prime Minister Yoshiro Mori and Singaporean Prime Minister Goh Chok Tong formally negotiate Japan-Singapore Economic Agreement for a New Age Partnership (JSEPA).
 October 26 – Pakistani authorities announce that their police have found an apparent mummy of an alleged Persian Princess in the province of Balochistan, Pakistan. The governments of Iran, Pakistan as well as the Taliban of Afghanistan all claim the mummy until Pakistan announces it is a modern-day forgery in April 2001.
 October 31 
 Soyuz TM-31 is launched, carrying the first resident crew to the International Space Station. The ISS has been continuously crewed since.
Singapore Airlines Flight 006 collides with construction equipment in the Chiang Kai Shek International Airport, resulting in 83 deaths.

November
 November 2 – The first resident crew enters the International Space Station.
 November 7 – The 2000 United States presidential election: No winner can be declared, prompting a controversial recount in Florida.
 November 11 – Kaprun disaster, Austria: A funicular fire in an Alpine tunnel kills 155 skiers and snowboarders.
 November 12 – The United States recognizes the Federal Republic of Yugoslavia.
 November 17 – A catastrophic landslide in Log pod Mangartom, Slovenia, kills 7, and causes millions of SIT of damage. It is one of the worst catastrophes in Slovenia in the past 100 years.
 November 20 – Alberto Fujimori, President of Peru, faxes his resignation from a hotel room in Japan, after fleeing Peru after facing corruption charges. Fujimori would be officially removed from office by Congress on the 22nd.

December
 December 7 – Kadisoka temple is discovered in Sleman, Yogyakarta, Indonesia.
 December 12 – Bush v. Gore: The United States Supreme Court rules that the recount of the 2000 presidential election in Florida should be halted and the original results be certified, thus making George W. Bush the winner of the U.S. presidential election.
 December 15 – The third and final reactor at the Chernobyl Nuclear Power Plant is shut down and the station is shut down completely.
 December 24 - The Christmas Eve bombings in several churches in Indonesia, kills 18 people.
 December 25 – The Luoyang Christmas fire at a shopping center in China kills 309 people.

World population

Births

January–March

 January 1 – Ice Spice, American Rapper 
 January 7 – Lea Friedrich, German cyclist
 January 8 – Noah Cyrus, American actress and singer
 January 14 – Jonathan David, Canadian soccer player
 January 19 – Choi Da-bin, South Korean figure skater
 January 20 – Tyler Herro, American basketball player
 January 25 – Marie Le Net, French cyclist
 January 27 – Aurélien Tchouaméni, French football player
 January 28 – Dušan Vlahović, Serbian footballer
 January 31 
 Julián Álvarez, Argentine footballer
 Hugo Guillamón, Spanish footballer
 February 10 – Yara Shahidi, American actress
 February 20 – Kristóf Milák, Hungarian swimmer
 February 29 – Ferran Torres, Spanish footballer
 March 2 – Nahida Akter, Bangladeshi cricketer
 March 3 – Harnaaz Sandhu, Indian model, actress and pageant titleholder won Miss Universe 2021
March 9 – Khaby Lame, Senegalese-Italian social media personality
 March 25 – Jadon Sancho, English footballer 
 March 27 – Sophie Nélisse, Canadian actress
 March 28 – Aleyna Tilki, Turkish singer and songwriter

April–June

 April 6 – Shaheen Afridi, Pakistani cricketer
 April 9 
 Jackie Evancho, American soprano
 Stanley Mburu, Kenyan long distance runner
 April 13 – Rasmus Dahlin, Swedish ice hockey player
 April 17 – Alexander Blonz, Norwegian handball player
 April 19 – Azzedine Ounahi, Moroccan footballer
 April 22 – Asier Martínez, Spanish hurdler
 April 23 – Chloe Kim, American snowboarder
 April 25 – Dejan Kulusevski, Swedish footballer
 April 28 – Ellie Carpenter, Australian footballer
 May 11 – Yuki Tsunoda, Japanese racing driver 
 May 15 – Dayana Yastremska, Ukrainian tennis player
 May 27 – Jade Carey, American artistic gymnast
 May 28 – Taylor Ruck, Canadian swimmer
 May 30 – Jared S. Gilmore, American actor
 June 1 – Willow Shields, American actress and dancer
 June 3 – Alison dos Santos, Brazilian hurdler
 June 9 – Laurie Hernandez, American artistic gymnast
 June 13 – Penny Oleksiak, Canadian swimmer
 June 16 – Bianca Andreescu, Canadian tennis player

July–September

 July 1 – Lalu Muhammad Zohri, Indonesian sprinter
 July 4 – Rikako Ikee, Japanese swimmer
 July 6 – Zion Williamson, American basketball player
 July 12 – Vinícius Júnior, Brazilian footballer
 July 15 – Paulinho, Brazilian footballer
 July 18 – Angelina Melnikova, Russian artistic gymnast
 July 21 – Erling Haaland, Norwegian footballer
 July 26 – Thomasin McKenzie, New Zealand actress
 July 25 – Meg Donnelly, American actress
 August 2 – Mohammed Kudus, Ghanaian footballer
 August 4 – Gabriela Agúndez, Mexican diver
 August 8
 Félix Auger-Aliassime, Canadian tennis player
 Lauren Hemp, English footballer
 August 20 – Fátima Ptacek, American actress and model
 August 23 – Florian Grengbo, French track cyclist
 August 29 – Julia Grosso, Canadian soccer player
 September 7 – Ariarne Titmus, Australian swimmer
 September 14 – Ethan Ampadu, Welsh footballer
 September 19 – Jakob Ingebrigtsen, Norwegian runner
 September 26
 Salma bint Abdullah, Jordanian princess 
 Donavan Grondin, French track cyclist
 September 28 – Frankie Jonas, American actor

October–December

 October 1 – Kalle Rovanperä, Finnish professional rally driver
 October 6
 Kyle Pitts, American football player
 Addison Rae, American social media personality, dancer, and singer
 Jazz Jennings, American internet personality
 October 9 – Sena Irie, Japanese boxer
 October 20 – Dominik Szoboszlai, Hungarian footballer
 November 2 – Alphonso Davies, Canadian soccer player
 November 3 – Sergiño Dest, American soccer player
 November 4 – Sun Yingsha, Chinese table tennis player
 November 7 – Callum Hudson-Odoi, English footballer
 November 8 – S10, Dutch singer and rapper
 November 10 – Mackenzie Foy, American model and actress
 November 14 – Jacob Kiplimo, Ugandan long distance runnner
 November 14 – Josh Green, Australian basketball player
 November 20 
 Rosa Linn, Armenian singer
 Connie Talbot, British singer
 November 22 – Auliʻi Cravalho, American actress, voice actress, and singer
 December 22 – Pauletta Foppa, French handball player
 December 26 – Vittoria Guazzini, Italian cyclist
 December 28 – Larissa Manoela, Brazilian actress and singer

Deaths

January

 January 2
 Patrick O'Brian, British writer (b. 1914)
 Princess María de las Mercedes of Bourbon-Two Sicilies, mother of King Juan Carlos I (b. 1910)
 January 3 – Bernhard Wicki, Austrian actor and director (b. 1919)
 January 4 – Spyros Markezinis, Greek politician, 169th Prime Minister of Greece (b. 1909)
 January 6 – Alexey Vyzmanavin, Russian chess Grandmaster (b. 1960)
 January 13 – Antti Hyvärinen, Finnish Olympic ski jumper (b. 1932)
 January 15 – Željko Ražnatović, Serbian mobster and paramilitary leader (b. 1952)
 January 19
 Bettino Craxi, Italian politician, 45th Prime Minister of Italy (b. 1934)
 Hedy Lamarr, Austrian actress (b. 1914)
 January 21 – Saeb Salam, Lebanese politician, 20th Prime Minister of Lebanon (b. 1905)
 January 23 – Marat Ospanov, Kazakh politician, 1st Chairman of Mazhilis (b. 1949)
 January 26
 Don Budge, American tennis player (b. 1915)
 A. E. van Vogt, Canadian-American science fiction author (b. 1912)

February

 February 5 – Claude Autant-Lara, French film director (b. 1901)
 February 7 – Big Pun, American rapper (b. 1971)
 February 8 – Ion Gheorghe Maurer, Romanian lawyer and politician, 49th Prime Minister of Romania (b. 1902)
 February 10 – Jim Varney, American actor and comedian (b. 1949)
 February 11
 Jacqueline Auriol, French aviator (b. 1917)
 Roger Vadim, French film director and producer (b. 1928)
 February 12
 Charles M. Schulz, American comic strip artist (b. 1922)
 Screamin' Jay Hawkins, American rock singer and performer (b. 1929)
 February 19
 Friedensreich Hundertwasser, Austrian artist (b. 1928)
 Djidingar Dono Ngardoum, 2nd Prime Minister of Chad (b. 1928)
 February 23
 Ofra Haza, Israeli singer (b. 1957)
 Sir Stanley Matthews, English footballer (b. 1915)

March

 March 2 – Sandra Schmirler, Canadian Olympic curler (b. 1963)
 March 5 – Lolo Ferrari, French actress and dancer (b. 1963)
 March 6 – Abraham Waligo, Ugandan politician, 4th Prime Minister of Uganda (b. 1928)
 March 7 – Charles Gray, English actor (b. 1928)
 March 11 – Alfred Schwarzmann, German gymnast (b. 1912)
 March 12 – Mack Robinson, American athlete (b. 1914)
 March 27 – Ian Dury, British rock musician (b. 1942)
 March 28 – Anthony Powell, British author (b. 1905)
 March 30 – Rudolf Kirchschläger, Austrian diplomat and 8th President of Austria (b. 1915)

April

 April 2 – Tommaso Buscetta, Italian mafioso informant (b. 1928)
 April 3 – Terence McKenna, American ethnobotanist, writer and public speaker (b. 1946)
 April 5 – Lee Petty, American race-car driver (b. 1914)
 April 6 – Habib Bourguiba, 1st President of Tunisia (b. 1903)
 April 8 – Claire Trevor, American actress (b. 1910)
 April 10 – Rabah Bitat, Algerian politician and Interim President of Algeria (b. 1925)
 April 15 – Edward Gorey, American writer and illustrator (b. 1925)
 April 16 – Putra of Perlis, Malaysian King (b. 1920)
 April 28 – Penelope Fitzgerald, English novelist, poet, essayist and biographer (b. 1916)
 April 29 – Phạm Văn Đồng, 2nd Prime Minister of the Democratic Republic of Vietnam (North Vietnam) (b. 1906)
 April 30 – Poul Hartling, Danish diplomat and politician, 21st Prime Minister of Denmark (b. 1914)

May

 May 1 – Steve Reeves, American actor and bodybuilder (b. 1926)
 May 7 – Douglas Fairbanks Jr., American actor (b. 1909)
 May 8 – Hubert Maga, 1st President of Dahomey (b. 1916)
 May 14 – Keizō Obuchi, Japanese politician, 54th Prime Minister of Japan (b. 1937)
 May 19
 Petter Hugsted, Norwegian Olympic ski jumper (b. 1921)
 Yevgeny Khrunov, Soviet cosmonaut (b. 1933)
 May 21
 Dame Barbara Cartland, British novelist (b. 1901)
 Sir John Gielgud, British actor (b. 1904)
 Erich Mielke, German secret police official (b. 1907)
 May 24 – Oleg Yefremov, Soviet and Russian actor and theater producer (b. 1927)
 May 25 – Francis Lederer, French film and stage actor (b. 1899)
 May 27 – Maurice Richard, Canadian hockey player (b. 1921)
 May 31 
 Petar Mladenov, Bulgarian diplomat and politician, 1st President of Bulgaria (b. 1936)
 Tito Puente, American jazz musician (b. 1923)

June

 June 3 – Merton Miller, American economist and academic, Nobel Prize laureate (b. 1923)
 June 10 – Hafez al-Assad, Syrian politician and general, 18th President of Syria (b. 1930)
 June 16 – Empress Kōjun of Japan (b. 1903)
 June 18 – Nancy Marchand, American actress (b. 1928)
 June 19 – Noboru Takeshita, Japanese politician, 46th Prime Minister of Japan (b. 1924)
 June 24 – David Tomlinson, English actor (b. 1917)
 June 27 – Pierre Pflimlin, French politician, 97th Prime Minister of France (b. 1907)
 June 29 – Vittorio Gassman, Italian actor (b. 1922)

July

 July 1 – Walter Matthau, American actor (b. 1920)
 July 2 – Joey Dunlop, Northern Irish motorcyclist (b. 1952)
 July 6 – Lazar Koliševski, 2nd President of Yugoslavia (b. 1914)
 July 8 – FM-2030, Transhumanist philosopher (b. 1930)
 July 11 – Robert Runcie, Archbishop of Canterbury (b. 1921)
 July 14 – Sir Mark Oliphant, Australian nuclear physicist and humanitarian (b. 1901)
 July 15 – Kalle Svensson, Swedish footballer (b. 1925)
 July 28 – Abraham Pais, American physicist (b. 1918)
 July 29 – René Favaloro, Argentinian cardiologist (b. 1923)

August

 August 5 – Sir Alec Guinness, English actor and writer (b. 1914)
 August 9 – John Harsanyi, Hungarian-born economist (b. 1920)
 August 12 – Loretta Young, American actress (b. 1913)
 August 13 – Nazia Hassan, Pakistani singer (b. 1965)
 August 21 – Daniel Lisulo, Zambian politician, 3rd Prime Minister of Zambia (b. 1930)
 August 22 – Abulfaz Elchibey, Azerbaijani political figure, 2nd President of Azerbaijan (b. 1938)
 August 24 – Andy Hug, Swiss Seidokaikan karateka and kickboxer (b. 1964)
 August 25
 Carl Barks, American cartoonist and screenwriter (b. 1901)
 Ivan Stambolić, Serbian politician (b. 1936)
 August 26
Lynden Pindling, Bahamian politician and Prime Minister (b. 1930)
Bunny Austin, English tennis player (b. 1906)

September

 September 6 – Abdul Haris Nasution, Indonesian general (b. 1918)
 September 12- Gary Olsen, English actor (b. 1957)
 September 14 – Beah Richards, American actress (b. 1920)
 September 16 – Georgiy Gongadze, Ukrainian journalist (b. 1969)
 September 17 – Paula Yates, British television presenter (b. 1959)
 September 19 – Ann Doran, American actress (b. 1911)
 September 20 – Gherman Titov, Soviet cosmonaut (b. 1935)
 September 22 – Saburō Sakai, Japanese fighter ace (b. 1916)
 September 26 – Richard Mulligan, American actor (b. 1932)
 September 28
 Pote Sarasin, Thai diplomat and politician, 9th Prime Minister of Thailand (b. 1905)
 Pierre Trudeau, 15th Prime Minister of Canada (b. 1919)

October

 October 1
 Rosie Douglas, 5th Prime Minister of Dominica (b. 1941)
 Reginald Kray, British gangster and club owner (b. 1933)
 October 4 – Michael Smith, English-born chemist and Nobel laureate (b. 1932)
 October 6 – Richard Farnsworth, American actor (b. 1920)
 October 7 – Walter Krupinski, German fighter ace and general (b. 1920)
 October 10 – Sirimavo Bandaranaike, 2-time Prime Minister of Ceylon and 2-time Prime Minister of Sri Lanka (b. 1916)
 October 11 – Donald Dewar, First Minister of Scotland (b. 1937)
 October 13 – Jean Peters, American actress (b. 1926)
 October 15 – Konrad Emil Bloch, German-born biochemist (b. 1912)
 October 18
 Julie London, American singer and actress (b. 1926)
 Gwen Verdon, American actress and dancer (b. 1925)
 October 22 – Jean-Luc Mandaba, 11th Prime Minister of Central African Republic (b. 1943)
 October 23 
 Yokozuna, American professional wrestler (b. 1966)
 Nils Tapp, Swedish Olympic cross-country skier (b. 1917)
 October 27 – Walter Berry, Austrian bass-baritone (b. 1929)
 October 30 – Steve Allen, American comedian and author (b. 1921)
 October 31 – Ring Lardner, Jr., American screenwriter (b. 1915)

November

 November 5
 Jimmie Davis, American singer (b. 1899)
 Roger Peyrefitte, French writer and diplomat (b. 1907)
 November 6 – L. Sprague de Camp, American writer (b. 1907)
 November 7
 C Subramaniam, Indian politician (b. 1910)
 Ingrid of Sweden, Queen consort of Denmark (b. 1910)
 November 8 – Józef Pińkowski, Polish politician, 50th Prime Minister of Poland (b. 1929)
 November 10
 Adamantios Androutsopoulos, Greek lawyer and professor, 168th Prime Minister of Greece (b. 1919)
 Jacques Chaban-Delmas, French politician, 102nd Prime Minister of France (b. 1915)
 November 17 – Louis Néel, French physicist and academic, Nobel Prize laureate (b. 1904)
 November 19 – George Cosmas Adyebo, Ugandan economist and politician, 6th Prime Minister of Uganda (b. 1947)
 November 22
 Christian Marquand, French actor and director (b. 1927)
 Emil Zátopek, Czechoslovakian Olympic athlete (b. 1922)
 November 28 – Liane Haid, Austrian actress (b. 1895)

December

 December 2 – Gail Fisher, American actress (b. 1935)
 December 3 – Gwendolyn Brooks, American writer (b. 1917)
 December 6 – Werner Klemperer, German-American actor and singer (b. 1920)
 December 8 – Ionatana Ionatana, 5th Prime Minister of Tuvalu (b. 1938)
 December 10 – Marie Windsor, American actress (b. 1919)
 December 11 – Johannes Virolainen, Finnish politician, 30th Prime Minister of Finland (b. 1914)
 December 12 – George Montgomery, American actor (b. 1916)
 December 18 – Kirsty MacColl, English singer (b. 1959)
 December 19 – Son Sann, Cambodian politician, 24th Prime Minister of Cambodia (b. 1911)
 December 23 – Victor Borge, Danish-born American actor and comedian (b. 1909)
 December 26 – Jason Robards, American actor (b. 1922)
 December 30 – Julius J. Epstein, American screenwriter (b. 1909)

Nobel Prizes

 Chemistry – Alan J. Heeger, Alan MacDiarmid, and Hideki Shirakawa
 Economics – James Heckman and Daniel McFadden
 Literature – Gao Xingjian
 Peace – Kim Dae-jung
 Physics – Zhores Alferov, Herbert Kroemer, and Jack Kilby
 Physiology or Medicine – Arvid Carlsson, Paul Greengard, and Eric Kandel

See also

 2000 in politics
 Y2K (disambiguation)

References

 
Leap years in the Gregorian calendar